Charles Keeble (born 6 January 1934) is a former Australian figure skater who competed at the 1956 Winter Olympics. He scored 123.93 points and finished 16th out of 16 competitors in the men's individual event.

References 

Charles Keeble's profile at Sports Reference.com

Australian male single skaters
Olympic figure skaters of Australia
Figure skaters at the 1956 Winter Olympics
1934 births
Living people